Triloba is a genus of gastropods belonging to the family Clausiliidae.

The species of this genus are found in the Balkans.

Species:

Triloba sandrii 
Triloba talevi 
Triloba thaumasia

References

Clausiliidae